Rolf Larsen (born 10 December 1948) is a Norwegian weightlifter. He competed in the men's middle heavyweight event at the 1976 Summer Olympics.

References

1948 births
Living people
Norwegian male weightlifters
Olympic weightlifters of Norway
Weightlifters at the 1976 Summer Olympics
Sportspeople from Skien
20th-century Norwegian people